Marino Busdachin is an Italian politician and human rights activist. Busdachin was born in Umag (Istria, Croatia) in 1956, and moved to Italy with his family in 1961. He studied law at the University of Trieste.

Political involvement
During the 1970s he campaigned for civil rights in Italy (right to conscientious objection, divorce and abortion). He was elected at an early age to the Federal Council of the Transnational Radical Party (1974–present) and the City Council of Trieste (1978–82).

During the 1980s he campaigned with the Transnational Radical Party to promote human, civil and political rights in Eastern Europe and the Soviet Union. He was arrested and jailed for his activities in Bulgaria (1982) and in the Soviet Union (1989).

Between 1993 and 1998, he worked in the United States on international campaigns for the establishment of ad hoc international tribunals to prosecute war crimes in the Former Yugoslavia and Rwanda. He also lobbied for a moratorium on the death penalty at the United Nations where he represented the Transnational Radical Party.

He is one of the leading figures of the Nonviolent Radical Party (former Transnational Radical Party) and a member of its general council.

No Peace Without Justice
He was a founder and General Secretary of Non c’e’ Pace Senza Giustizia - No Peace Without Justice (1994-1999), an NGO based in Italy, Belgium and the United States which campaigned for the establishment of an International Criminal Court.

Unrepresented Nations and Peoples Organization
On July 1, 2003 Marino Busdachin was appointed Secretary General of the Unrepresented Nations and Peoples Organization (UNPO), an international NGO based in The Hague (Netherlands), whose works focuses on promoting the rights of minorities.

Sources

 Biography of Marino Busdachin on the website of the Nonviolent Radical Party
 Speech at the United Nations calling for the establishment of an International Criminal Court
 Intervention of Marino Busdachin at the 38th Congress of the Radical Party in Geneva
 Interviews of Marino Busdachin on Radio Radicale

See also
 Nonviolent Radical Party
 Unrepresented Nations and Peoples Organization
 No Peace Without Justice

External links
 Marino Busdachin at the Dalai Lama's Conference in Hamburg

1956 births
Living people
People from Umag
Istrian Italian people
Italian politicians
University of Trieste alumni
Yugoslav emigrants to Italy